The Tasmanian Theatre Company is a theatre company based in Hobart, a city in the Australian state of Tasmania.

External links
 Official site

Theatre companies in Australia
Culture of Tasmania